Pilot Hill is a mountain in Dukes County, Massachusetts. Tashmoo Hill is located east-southeast of Pilot Hill.

References

Mountains of Massachusetts
Mountains of Dukes County, Massachusetts